High school secret societies are a type of secret society founded at, or featuring students associated with, a particular high school, primarily in the United States.

American universities have a long tradition of secret societies, initially started within East Coast colleges, and eventually trickling down into what became the secret societies found at America's oldest boarding schools.  Between 1898 and 1908, high school secret societies were a recognizable feature within the school system, and Otto C. Schneider, President of the Chicago School Board of 1908, took an active role in stopping their influence within secondary schools. Initial growth in the Midwest may have been fueled by competition with the East Coast. Boston Latin, the oldest public school in America, and Erasmus High School often had football matches with Chicago's top public schools, thereby spreading an influence from the East Coast to the Midwest. Many of Chicago's upper class students had East Coast connections. Introductions could have been made to the K.O.A and A.U.V. (Auctoritas, Unitas, Veritas) secret societies of Phillips Academy, of which Skull and Bones inductee George H. W. Bush was a member of the latter.

Phillips Academy Andover 
Secret societies at Phillips Academy remain prevalent to this day.  T.U.B. (Truth, Unity, Brotherhood), which is rumored to have started in 2001, and M.S.A.S. (Madame Sarah Abbot Society), rumored to have started in the late 19th century. According to Fritz Allis in his historical account of Phillips Academy, Youth From Every Quarter, “The Andover Secret Societies were unique among American secondary schools. To be sure there were various kinds of fraternities at high schools, and some private schools also had exclusive clubs. At Exeter, for example, Societies existed until World War II, but they were a pale copy of the Andover institutions.”

Phillips Exeter Academy 
K.E.P., or Kappa Epsilon Pi, founded at Phillips Exeter Academy in 1891, was one of several fraternities at PEA with the only one having a Preparatory Order of Death attached to it. Exeter's order is called "Skull and Wreath". It tapped 13 members and has a badge which is expensively crafted. It is gold with a skull and laurel wreath creation, incorporating seed pearls, rubies and emeralds. America's oldest high school secret society is the Golden Branch of Phillips Exeter Academy, founded in 1818, which is now the Daniel Webster Debate Society. Though administratively suppressed in the 1950s, there remains at least one secret society at Exeter. It is now coeducational.

Fenwick High School 
Fenwick High school in Oak Park, Illinois has a Preparatory Order of Death attached to it called the order of "Coffin and Bones", Pi Kappa Epsilon. This group taps 14 members, which they refer to as "boned in", and members are called "Morticians". Coffin and Bones (founded in 1929), the same year as the founding of Fenwick High School (Oak Park, Illinois) is known by its gold and ebony black badge, depicting a coffin and skull and cross bones outlined by seed pearls.

Preparatory Orders of Death 
Today, Yale's Order of Skull and Bones only recognizes Skull and Wreath and Coffin and Bones to be authentic Preparatory Orders of Death, based on its adherence to strict guidelines and relevant numbering system. Exeter's Skull and Wreath taps 13 members; Fenwick's Coffin and Bones taps 14 members; Yale's Skull and Bones taps 15 members, as does Yale's Scroll and Key ; Book and Snake taps 16 members as does Wolf's Head (secret society) as well. This establishes authentic continuity from high school secret societies to secret university orders. 

Coffin and Bones is an order that is meant to structure various symbolic clues and attributes into a system that incorporates Knights Templar code and the School's Dominican traditions as associated with St. Dominic. The Order protects the "School House Ark". Saint Dominic was canonized in the year of 1234, and Coffin and Bones structures attributes into an orderly numeric fashion: 1,2,3,4 etc. that is intended to reveal the mysteries in the search for the Holy Grail. The first clue of this Order is "Prime Rib" which references the "side" or "rib" of Adam and Eve. The street names surrounding Fenwick also provide clues to the school's mysteries, such as S. Scoville, which tells Morticians to go south to Scoville Park in order to find the "Knight's Horse" at the Horse Show Fountain. The Fountain was designed to be shaped into the Greek letter "Pi" as a reference to Coffin and Bones fraternal Order of Pi Kappa Epsilon. The Order is rumored to possess a pig skull named "Cairo" which is the Christian Coptic word for "vanquisher", "conqueror" and "man-breaker". This gave rise to Fenwick's lore of their students being "Men of Steel" which is referenced in the school's fight song. Fenwick's "Coffin" emblem symbolizes the Holy Sepulchre while its "Bones" emblem symbolizes Golgotha, but it is the first emblem that has given rise to Phi Kappa Epsilon's intrigue since it is also believed to reference Holy Sepulchre Cemetery (Worth, Illinois) which is within the jurisdiction of the Archdiocese of Chicago.               

Between 1880 and 1915, more than 50 high school secret societies were formed within Chicago. Hyde Park Academy, alone, had 18 groups, and battles with secret societies within the village of Oak Park, Illinois, were taken to the Appellate courts. By 1929, Oak Park had one of Illinois's top-ranking preparatory schools within its village, Fenwick High School, and the village ruled in favor of each school within Oak Park to individually oversee all of their students' secret societies, rather than implement a general regulatory system across the board.

See also 
Collegiate secret societies in North America
International Debutante Ball

References

Secret societies
Student societies in the United States